Alfredo Cornejo may refer to:
 Alfredo Cornejo (boxer)
 Alfredo Cornejo (politician)